The 2017 Ping An Chinese Football Association Super League was the 14th season since the establishment of the Chinese Super League. The league title sponsor is Ping An Insurance. Guangzhou Evergrande Taobao won their seventh consecutive title of the league.

This season witnessed a huge change in the regulation to the players. Only three foreign players can play at one game and at least two domestic players who are under the age of 23 (born on or after 1 January 1994) must be in the 18-man list, including at least one must be in the starting list.

Club changes 
Clubs promoted from 2016 China League One
 Tianjin Quanjian 
 Guizhou Hengfeng Zhicheng

Clubs relegated to 2017 China League One
 Hangzhou Greentown
 Shijiazhuang Ever Bright

Name changes 
 Beijing Guoan F.C. changed their name to Beijing Sinobo Guoan F.C. in January 2017.
 Chongqing Lifan F.C. changed their name to Chongqing Dangdai Lifan F.C. in January 2017.

Clubs

Clubs and locations

Managerial changes

Foreign players
A club may register seven foreign players per season.  However, only five foreign players could be registered at any given time. And to curtail their influence, only three foreign players may play per match.

Players name in bold indicates the player is registered during the mid-season transfer window.

 Foreign players who left their clubs or were sent to reserve team after first half of the season.

Hong Kong/Macau/Taiwan outfield players (Contracts signed before 1 January 2016 do not count towards foreign or Asian player slots.)

Last updated: 1 November 2016

League table

Results

Positions by round

Goalscorers

Top scorers
Source:

Top assists
Source:

Hat-tricks

Awards
The awards of 2017 Chinese Super League were announced on 11 November 2017.
 Player of the Year:  Eran Zahavi (Guangzhou R&F)
 Golden Boot:  Eran Zahavi (Guangzhou R&F)
 Golden Boot (Domestic Player):  Wu Lei (Shanghai SIPG)
 Best Goalkeeper:  Yan Junling (Shanghai SIPG)
 Young Player of the Year:  Hu Jinghang (Henan Jianye)
 U-23 Player of the Year:  Huang Zhengyu (Guangzhou R&F)
 Most Popular Player of the Year:  Zhang Chengdong (Hebei China Fortune)
 Manager of the Year:  Fabio Cannavaro (Tianjin Quanjian)
 Fair Play Award: Chongqing Dangdai Lifan, Hebei China Fortune, Yanbian Funde
 Best Referee:  Ma Ning
 Best Assistant Referee:  Huo Weiming
 Team of the Year:
Goalkeeper: Yan Junling (Shanghai SIPG)
Defence: Jiang Zhipeng (Guangzhou R&F), Feng Xiaoting (Guangzhou Evergrande Taobao), Huang Zhengyu (Guangzhou R&F), Wang Shenchao (Shanghai SIPG)
Midfield: Eran Zahavi (Guangzhou R&F), Hao Junmin (Shandong Luneng Taishan), Wu Lei (Shanghai SIPG), Ricardo Goulart (Guangzhou Evergrande Taobao)
Attack: Gao Lin (Guangzhou Evergrande Taobao), Hulk (Shanghai SIPG)

League attendance

†
†

Notes

References

External links
Regulations of 2017 Chinese Super League 
Current CSL table, and recent results/fixtures at Soccerway
Chinese Super League table at FIFA
Chinese Super League official site 

Chinese Super League seasons
1
China